Pete Medd is an American retired soccer player who was the president of Crystal Palace Baltimore. He also served as the team's co-manager along with Jim Cherneski from 2007 to 2009.

Youth
Pete Medd graduated from Middletown High School. He was the former Maryland State High School Player of the Year and led his team to the State Championship Title in 1993. In 1994, he entered Towson University where he played from 1994 to 1998.  He was a four-year starter, regional first team selection and captain of Towson University. He helped lead Towson to a Division 1 Top 15 NCAA National Ranking.

Player
In 1999, Medd spent a single season with the Delaware Wizards of USISL but never featured in a game.  He was also the 1999 First Round Draft Pick for the Baltimore Blast of the National Professional Soccer League.  He only played in one game for the Blast during the 2000–2001 season.

Coach
In 1999, Medd became an assistant coach at Towson University, a position he held until 2001.  That year, he moved to Essex Community College where he was the school's head coach.  During his tenure, he led the team to a National Top 5 Ranking and was two time East Region Coach of the Year.  In 2007, he was self-hired as the head coach of Crystal Palace Baltimore, a USL Second Division team associated with English club Crystal Palace F.C.  The club discontinued operations in 2010.

References

1976 births
Living people
American soccer coaches
American soccer players
Baltimore Blast (NPSL) players
Crystal Palace Baltimore managers
Delaware Wizards players
National Professional Soccer League (1984–2001) players
Soccer players from Maryland
Towson Tigers men's soccer players
Association footballers not categorized by position
People from Middletown, Maryland